Snønutane Peaks is a group of rock peaks rising above the elevated snow surface just east of Snøbjørga Bluff, in the Mühlig-Hofmann Mountains of Queen Maud Land. Mapped by Norwegian cartographers from surveys and air photos by the Norwegian Antarctic Expedition (1956–60) and named Snønutane ("the snow peaks").

References

Mountains of Queen Maud Land
Princess Martha Coast